Bibliography of fantasy and science fiction writer Patricia A. McKillip:

Not all of these ISBNs are for first editions.

The Riddle-Master trilogy 

Omnibus editions (all 3 books):

The Cygnet series

Kyreol series

Winter Rose duology

Other works

Short stories 
The short stories and the publications in which they appear under them.

References

 
Bibliographies by writer
Bibliographies of American writers
Fantasy bibliographies
Science fiction bibliographies